Jim Gavin (born 1 July 1971) is an Irish Gaelic football manager and former player. He was the manager of the senior Dublin county team from 2012 to 2019, becoming the county's most successful manager in terms of major titles won. Gavin is regarded as one of the best managers in the modern game.

Gavin was introduced to Gaelic football by his father, a native of Clare and former chairman of the local club team in Clondalkin. He developed his skills in the local street leagues before winning a record six Cumann na mBunscoil medals as a dual player with Clonburris National School. Gavin attended and represented Moyle Park College, before later enjoying championship successes at underage levels with the Round Towers club.

Gavin made his debut on the inter-county scene at the age of sixteen when he first linked up with the Dublin minor team. Gavin joined the Dublin senior team during the 1992–93 league. He went on to play a key role for Dublin over much of the next decade, and won one All-Ireland medal, three Leinster medals and one National Football League medal. Gavin retired from inter-county football following the conclusion of the 2002 championship.

After being involved in team management and coaching in all grades at club level, Gavin guided the Dublin under-21 team to All-Ireland success in 2003. He later claimed two more All-Ireland titles in this grade in 2010 and 2012. Gavin was appointed manager of the Dublin senior team on 1 October 2012. He has since gone on to lead Dublin through a period of unprecedented provincial and national dominance, winning seventeen major honours. Many of the trophies he has accumulated as manager have been won in successive seasons. These include four successive National Leagues, seven successive Leinster Championships and a record-breaking five successive All-Ireland Championships (these include four league-championship doubles). In addition, Gavin has won a further one All-Ireland title, one National League and one O'Byrne Cup as Dublin manager.

Early life
Gavin was born in the Clonburris area of Clondalkin. His parents are both from west County Clare - his father Jim Senior is originally from Cree and his mother Ann (née Vaughan) is from Moy. His father previously won a county championship with Cooraclare GAA in 1964, and coached neighbourhood teams in the local street leagues at various levels. His grandfathers both fought in the Irish War of Independence.

Jim represented Clonburris Primary School in Gaelic games, winning six out of six Cumann na mBunscoil finals in Croke Park - three in football and three in hurling.

At 18, Gavin joined the Irish Defense Forces as a cadet.

Playing career
Gavin attended Moyle Park College, where he played for the college team. His performances for Round Towers caught the eye of the Dublin selectors, making his senior debut in 1993.

His subsequent military pilot training with the Irish Air Corps ruled him out of any involvement with the under-21 side. With Dublin, Gavin won the 1995 All-Ireland Senior Football Championship.

Management career

In 2009, he coached Dublin to a Leinster Under 21 Football Championship and progressed to the All-Ireland final where they lost to Cork. He repeated the Leinster victory in 2010, going one better than the previous year by winning the All-Ireland Under 21 Football Championship final. His selectors were Declan Darcy, Shane O'Hanlon and Jim Brogan.

Gavin was ratified as senior football manager on 1 October 2012, replacing Pat Gilroy and signing a three-year contract (2013–2015). Michael Deegan, David Byrne and Declan D'Arcy were his selectors for 2013. On 28 April 2013, Dublin won the first of four consecutive National Football League titles a 0–18 to 0–17 win against Tyrone at Croke Park. Then he complained that things were "too drawn out". He led Dublin to the 2013 All-Ireland Senior Football Championship Final, with the team defeating Kerry in the semi-final on a scoreline of 3–18 to 3–11. Dublin won the final on 22 September 2013, beating Mayo by 2–12 to 1–14. In December 2013, Gavin was named the 2013 Philips Sports Manager of the Year.

In September 2015, Dublin again beat Kerry 0–12 to 0–9 to win their second All-Ireland title in three years. The following year in September 2016, Dublin were held to a 2–9 to 0–15 draw in the 2016 All-Ireland Final by Mayo but prevailed in the replay in October, winning back to back All Irelands and their third title in four years with a scoreline of 1–15 to 1–14.  In September 2017, he led Dublin to their third All Ireland in a row when they again defeated Mayo by a scoreline of 1–17 to 1–16. This was Gavin's fourth All Ireland Senior Football championship as the Dublin manager. In 2018, he led Dublin to their fourth All-Ireland in a row when they defeated Tyrone by a scoreline of 2–17 to 1–14. This was Gavin's fifth All-Ireland Senior Football championship as the Dublin manager.

Under his management, the Dublin senior football team established a new record for most National League and Championship games unbeaten. In March 2017, when beating Roscommon by 2–29 to 0–14 in a National League game at Croke Park, Dublin set a new record of playing 35 games in League and Championship without defeat. They extended their unbeaten run to 36 games a week later with a win away to Monaghan in the National League. That 36-game unbeaten run finally came to an end on 10 April 2017 in the National League Final where they lost by a single point 0–20 to 1–16 to Kerry, the previous holders of the record which had stood for 84 years.

He stepped down as manager on 30 November 2019. He informed his players at Innisfails in Balgriffin on a Saturday evening that month.

Personal life 
Gavin is married to Jennifer; the couple live in Dublin with their two children.

Gavin is a qualified commercial pilot, and after his retirement as Dublin manager, he started working for the Irish Aviation Authority as a director of people and operations. 

In 2019, Gavin received an honorary doctorate from Dublin City University, and in 2020 he was made a Freeman of the City of Dublin. 

In 2022, it was announced that he would chair a citizen's assembly on a directly elected mayor for Dublin.

Career statistics

Manager

Honours

Military
United Nations Mission in the Central African Republic and Chad (MINURCAT) Medal; one of only 3 Irish Officers to serve in CAR
Irish Peace Keepers Medal

Civilian
Freedom of the City of Dublin by Dublin City Council: 2020

Player
Dublin
All-Ireland Senior Football Championship (1): 1995
Leinster Senior Football Championship (3): 1993, 1994, 1995
National Football League (1): 1992-93

Manager
Dublin
All-Ireland Senior Football Championship (6): 2013, 2015, 2016, 2017, 2018, 2019
Leinster Senior Football Championship (7): 2013, 2014, 2015, 2016, 2017, 2018, 2019
National Football League (5): 2013, 2014, 2015, 2016, 2018
O'Byrne Cup (1): 2015
All-Ireland Under-21 Football Championship (3): 2003, 2010, 2012
Leinster Under-21 Football Championship (3): 2003, 2010, 2012

Individual
Philips Sports Manager of the Year (2): 2013, 2019
RTÉ Sports Manager of the Year Award (1): 2019

References

1971 births
Living people
Commercial aviators
Dublin inter-county Gaelic footballers
Gaelic football forwards
Gaelic football managers
Military personnel from Dublin (city)
People from Clondalkin
Sportspeople from South Dublin (county)
Round Towers Clondalkin Gaelic footballers
Winners of one All-Ireland medal (Gaelic football)